Alma Park may refer to:

Alma Park, New South Wales, in Australia
Alma Park, St Kilda East, Victoria, Australia
Alma Park Zoo, in Queensland, Australia
Alma Park Estate, earlier RAF Belton Park, in Lincolnshire, England
Alma Park, a park in Los Angeles, U.S.

See also
Alma (disambiguation)